Cleophas Paynter (1943 – 27 April 1983) was a Vincentian cricket umpire. He stood in one Test and one ODI match in 1977.

References

1943 births
1983 deaths
West Indian Test cricket umpires
West Indian One Day International cricket umpires
Saint Vincent and the Grenadines sportsmen